Mount Dover is a mountain in Antarctica,  high, surmounting the southeast end of Gale Ridge where the ridge abuts the Washington Escarpment, in the Neptune Range, Pensacola Mountains. It was mapped by the United States Geological Survey from surveys and U.S. Navy air photos, 1956–66, and was named by the Advisory Committee on Antarctic Names for James H. Dover, a geologist with the Patuxent Range field party in 1962–63.

References 

Mountains of Queen Elizabeth Land
Pensacola Mountains